The 1909 Scottish Cup final was the final of the 36th season of the Scottish Cup. The match was an Old Firm affair contested by Rangers and Celtic at Hampden Park, with the trophy being withheld by the Scottish Football Association following crowd disorder.

The final ended 2–2 on 10 April, prompting a replay which took place on 17 April. When that ended 1–1, the initial assumption was that extra time would follow, but competition rules only provided for that in the event of a second replay. When it became clear to the crowd that extra time would not be played, and fuelled by rumours that the results were manipulated to increase ticket revenue, the crowd invaded the pitch. In the ensuing disorder, the goalposts were torn down, parts of the pitch were ripped up and the wooden pay-boxes were set alight. Mounted police and the fire brigade also came under attack and in total there were over 100 injuries.
 
Both clubs requested the SFA not schedule a second replay and subsequently, the trophy and medals were withheld. Queen's Park F.C., the owners of Hampden, were paid £500 in compensation by the SFA, who ordered both competing clubs to pay an additional £150 each.

Summary

Teams

References

External links
Scottish Cup Archive Game 1
Scottish Cup Archive Game 2
Fitbastats.com - Scottish Cup Final 1909
Fitbastats.com - Scottish Cup Final replay 1909

1909
Scottish Cup Final 1909
Scottish Cup Final 1909
Association football riots
1900s in Glasgow
1909 in Scottish sport
April 1909 sports events
1909 riots
Riots and civil disorder in Scotland
Old Firm matches